Centrum Nauki Kopernik is a station on the central part of Line M2 of the Warsaw Metro.

The station fully opened for passenger use on 8 March 2015 as part of the inaugural stretch of Line M2 between Rondo Daszyńskiego and Dworzec Wileński. It was designed by Polish architect Andrzej M. Chołdzyński and constructed by Metroprojekt. Murals were created by Wojciech Fangor, artist of the Polish School of Posters.

The station is  near the Wybrzeże Kościuszkowskie street, very close to the bank of the Vistula river and the Copernicus Science Centre which it is named after.

Gallery

References

External links

ZTM Municipal Transport Authority website - Warsaw Metro page

Railway stations in Poland opened in 2015
Line 2 (Warsaw Metro) stations